Benue State University is a state-owned university in Makurdi, Benue State, Nigeria. In 2006, student enrollment was over 19,000 served by 7 faculties, 23 departments. The university offers undergraduate and postgraduate programs with a catalog of over 58 graduate programs across 9 colleges/faculties. It is accredited by the National Universities Commission. The current Vice-chancellor of Benue State University is  Professor Prof. Tor Iorapuu who took over from Professor Msugh Moses Kembe on 3rd of November, 2020.

History 
The university was founded in 1992 and served 306 students with 149 faculty. The university was established by the state government to augment the specialized academic offerings of the University of Agriculture, Makurdi. In 1991, the state government formed a 13-member steering committee to plan for and obtain approval for the university. The university began offering classes for the 1992/1993 school year in four colleges: Arts, Education, Sciences, and Social Science.

Faculties 
Benue State University has eight faculties (college-level) units:

 Arts
 College of Health Science
 Education
 Environmental Sciences
 Law
 Social Science
 Science
 Management Science

Resources

Library
The university's library complex, University Library and Information Services (ULIS) comprises units in the College of Health Sciences and the faculties of Arts, Education, Environmental Sciences, Law, Science, and Social Sciences. Other unit libraries serve the departments of Chemistry, and Mass Communications. This library system commenced operation from makeshift quarters at the inception of BSU in 1992. A new Central Library Complex, constructed with a grant from TETFund and designed to house 45,000 books and 3,000 students, was commissioned in August 2016.

Radio station
In 2015, the university's Department of Mass Communication started a radio station, BSU FM on 89.9 MHz.

Affiliated colleges 
 College of Education, Oju

Athletics 
Athletic activities are handled by the Sports Unit. The university participates in the Nigerian University Games Association and has won silver and bronze medals at NUGA's Sports Fiesta.

Facilities include a football field, basketball court, badminton court, volleyball court, and two tennis courts.

Awards 
 Silver Medal, Football (2001 NUGA Sports Fiesta)
 Silver Medal, Judo (2001 NUGA Sports Fiesta)
 Bronze Medal, Taekwando (2001 NUGA Sports Fiesta)

References

External links 
 
https://library.bsum.edu.ng/

 
Educational institutions established in 1992
1992 establishments in Nigeria
Public universities in Nigeria
Universities and colleges in Nigeria